Archie McCafferty is a Scottish born Australian serial killer. He was described as the Australian Charles Manson. Archie McCafferty was born in Scotland and emigrated to Australia when he was 10.

Murder Spree

In 1973, while living in Australia, McCafferty murdered 3 people, claiming his dead baby son told him to murder people. In 1974, he was imprisoned in Tamworth Correctional Centre and while in prison he murdered an inmate.

Deportation

In 1997 McCafferty was deported to Scotland.

References

Living people
Australian serial killers
Scottish serial killers
People deported from Australia
20th-century Australian criminals
Year of birth missing (living people)